The 2018 Big South men's basketball tournament was the postseason men's basketball tournament that ended the 2017–18 season of the Big South Conference. It was held from February 27 through March 4, 2018 at various campus sites. No. 2 seed Radford defeated No. 5 seed Liberty in the championship game to win the tournament and receive the conference's automatic bid to the NCAA tournament.

Sites 
The first round was played at campus sites at the home of the higher seed. The quarterfinals and semifinals were played at Kimmel Arena in Asheville, North Carolina, home of regular-season champion UNC Asheville. The championship game was held at the home arena of the higher surviving seed among the two finalists—in this case Radford's home of the Dedmon Center in Radford, Virginia.

Seeds
All 10 conference teams were eligible for the tournament. The top six teams received a first-round bye. Teams were seeded by record within the conference, with a tiebreaker system to seed teams with identical conference records.

Schedule

Bracket

References

External links
2018 Big South Men's Basketball Championship

Tournament
Big South Conference men's basketball tournament
Big South Conference men's basketball tournament
Big South Conference men's basketball tournament
Big South Conference men's basketball tournament
Big South Conference men's basketball tournament